Ola "The Swede" Englund (born 27 September 1981) is a Swedish guitarist, record producer, YouTuber, and the owner of Solar guitars. He is a founding-member of the band Feared, plays lead guitar in the Swedish metal band The Haunted, and is a former member of the band Six Feet Under. He has also been a part of Scarpoint, Facing Death, Subcyde and Sorcerer.

In 2018 and 2019, Total Guitar magazine awarded him as Best Internet Personality. In 2019, he released his first solo-album Master of the Universe. His second solo-album, Starzinger, was released on 26 April 2021.

Englund has a YouTube-channel under his own name where he makes videos about metal-related topics such as gear-demos, news, artist-interviews, Q&A, and behind-the-scenes-footage of his band-gigs and business. As of February 2023, his channel has 786,000 subscribers.

Influences
Englund cites his biggest influences as Pantera, Dream Theater, Nevermore, Sepultura, Testament, Bolt Thrower, Entombed, and Opeth. He is a big fan of former Pantera-guitarist Dimebag Darrell.

Discography

Singles 
 "Pizza Hawaii" (2019)
 "Cerberus" (2019)
 "Solar Pt. 1" (2019)
 "The Sun & the Moon" (2020)
 "Stars & Ponies" (2020)
 "Cringy AF" (2021)
 "Demon(etized)" (2021)

Gear
Englund has had signature-guitar-lines from Strictly 7 (2011–2013) and Washburn (2013–2017), as well as a signature amplifier from Randall known as the Randall Satan (2014-2019). In November 2017, he announced the launch of his own guitar-brand called Solar Guitars.

References

Living people
1981 births
Swedish YouTubers
Music YouTubers
Seven-string guitarists
Eight-string guitarists
Six Feet Under (band) members
The Haunted (Swedish band) members